Bolaji Badejo  (23 August 1953 – 22 December 1992) was a Nigerian visual artist and actor. He was known for playing the Alien in Ridley Scott's 1979 film Alien. It is his sole acting credit.

Life and career
Born in Lagos, Badejo was of Yoruba descent and was the son of the director general of the Nigerian Broadcasting Corporation. He first studied in Nigeria, then in the United States before finally moving to London to specialize in graphic design.

Badejo was discovered in a Soho pub by a member of director Ridley Scott's casting team, who had been searching for a candidate to play the titular creature in his science fiction film Alien. Standing at 6 ft 10 in tall, he was chosen to play the part due to his height and "very long legs". He was described as "mild-mannered" and "withdrawn" on set, and special effects supervisor Nick Allder said "To have been the center of attraction… it was a bit of a shock to him." Alien was released in 1979 to significant critical and commercial success, and Screen Rant wrote in a retrospective review that he "effectively brought the Xenomorph to life ... Badejo certainly helped make the creature one of the most recognizable monsters in horror."

The success of Alien spawned the Alien franchise. Badejo was offered roles for future installments, however he turned down the offer, and moved back to Nigeria in 1980; this led to the later sequels incorporating more puppetry and animation alongside several suit performers. Alien is his sole film credit.

After his return to Nigeria, Badejo began running his own art gallery in 1983. He died from sickle cell anaemia at the age of 39.

Filmography

See also
 Creature actor

References

External links

Nigerian male film actors
1953 births
1992 deaths
20th-century Nigerian male actors
Nigerian expatriates in the United Kingdom
Yoruba male actors
Alien (franchise)
Deaths from sickle-cell disease
Male actors from Lagos
Nigerian visual effects artists